Facundo Bagnis is the defending champion but lost in the quarterfinals.
Alejandro Falla won the title, defeating Horacio Zeballos 6–4, 6–1 in the final.

Seeds

Draw

Finals

Top half

Bottom half

References
 Main Draw
 Qualifying Draw

Seguros Bolivar Open Barranquilla - Singles
2012 Singles